The Dongying Port railway is a single-track freight-only railway line in China. It opened on 28 September 2020.

History
Tracklaying was completed on 31 December 2019.

Route
It departs from the Dezhou–Dajiawa railway east of Lijin South and heads north. A chord connects the line with the Huanghua–Dajiawa railway. The line has connected Dongying Port and Dongying Datang power station to the railway network.

References

Railway lines in China
Railway lines opened in 2020